Elizur Goodrich (March 24, 1761 – November 1, 1849) was an eighteenth-century American lawyer and politician from Connecticut. He served as a United States representative from Connecticut and Collector of Customs. He was also a slave owner.

Biography

Born in Durham in the Connecticut Colony, he was the son of Elizur Goodrich. He graduated from Yale College in 1779, was a tutor there from 1781 to 1783, and studied law. After his was admitted to the bar in 1783, he began the practice of law in New Haven. He served in the Connecticut House of Representatives from 1795 to 1802 and was its Clerk for six sessions and its Speaker for two.

In the 1796 United States presidential election he was a Federalist elector for President, supporting Federalist candidate John Adams against Democratic-Republican Party candidate Thomas Jefferson. He was elected to represent Connecticut At-Large to the Sixth and Seventh Congresses, but only served in the Sixth Congress from March 4, 1799 to March 3, 1801 because President John Adams appointed him collector of customs for the Port of New Haven. After a short time he was removed from the office of collector by Adams' successor, President Thomas Jefferson. The discussion of this act elicited from Jefferson a letter in which he avowed his approval of removal for political opinions.

Goodrich was elected to the Governor's Council in Connecticut in 1803, serving until 1818. He taught law at Yale from 1801 to 1810 and was probate judge from 1802 to 1818. From 1803 to 1822 he was also Mayor of New Haven.

Goodrich was a member of the Yale Corporation, the University's governing body, from 1809 to 1818 and was its Secretary from 1818 to 1846. Yale conferred the degree of LL.D. on him in 1830. Goodrich died in New Haven on November 1, 1849, and is interred in Grove Street Cemetery.

Personal life
Goodrich's son, Chauncey Allen Goodrich, married Noah Webster's daughter. His brother, also named Chauncey Goodrich, was a member of the United States House of Representatives.

Goodrich's wife, Annie Willard Allen Goodrich, was the sister of John Allen, a United States representative from Connecticut and a member of the Connecticut Supreme Court of Errors.

References

External links
 

 He is the second Elizur in this article.
 The Political Graveyard:Goodrich, Elizur (1761–1849)
 

1761 births
1849 deaths
Connecticut state court judges
Connecticut lawyers
American legal scholars
Members of the Connecticut General Assembly Council of Assistants (1662–1818)
Speakers of the Connecticut House of Representatives
Mayors of New Haven, Connecticut
Burials at Grove Street Cemetery
Yale College alumni
Federalist Party members of the United States House of Representatives from Connecticut
People of colonial Connecticut
19th-century American lawyers
American slave owners